Peder Lamm (born 4 December 1970) is a Swedish antiques expert and television personality, best known for his work at Otroligt antikt which is broadcast on SVT. Besides Otroligt antikt Lamm has also participated in På spåret, Extra Extra and Kockduellen.

Lamm was born in Lidingö, Sweden, the son of Jan Peder Lamm.

References

1970 births
Swedish television personalities
Living people
People from Lidingö Municipality